Sun Bear Concerts is a five-concert album compilation of solo piano performances by Keith Jarrett that took place during his November 1976 tour in Japan. It was originally released as a ten-LP set in 1978. It was rereleased in 1989 as a six-CD box set that added encores from three of the concerts, totalling 6:37:46 of music (applause included).

The structures of the documented concerts follow a similar pattern: two very long non-stop improvisations (from 31 to 43 minutes approx) plus a possible encore. Accordingly, it was not until the 1989 CD release (ECM 1100, 843 028-2) that the full performances could be heard as a whole.

In a 1979 interview, Jarrett stated: "I was involved in a very searching period of time when we recorded that, and the music itself was almost a release for the search. I've been thinking – Sun Bear is the only thing I've recorded that runs the gamut of human emotion. I think that if you got to know it well enough, you'd find it all in there someplace." Jarrett explained the origins of the title as follows: "On a Japanese tour I saw a sun bear in the zoo, a small bear which really looked friendly and doesn't exist anywhere outside Japan. The next day I asked our Japanese sound engineer about this animal because I remembered its face, a really friendly small face, and he replied, 'Yes, it's a beautiful bear but if you get near enough to him he will knock you three blocks down the road'. I simply liked the idea of an animal that looks as if it would be nice to get near to and which, when you do so, shakes your whole conception of life."

November 1976 solo tour in Japan 
All the music included in Sun Bear Concerts was recorded during Jarrett's solo tour in Japan which, according to www.keithjarrett.org, consisted of 8 concerts in 14 days:

 5 - Kaikan Hall, Kyoto
 6 - Denki Hall, Fukuoka
 8 - Sankei Hall, Osaka
 10 - NHK Hall, Tokyo
 12 - Aichi Auditorium, Nagoya
 14 - Nakano Sun Plaza, Tokyo
 16 - Kanagawa Kenmin Hall, Yokohama
 18 - Hokkaido Kosei Nenkin Hall, Sapporo

Reception 
The Allmusic review by Richard S. Ginell awarded the album 4 stars, stating, "While Sun Bear breaks little ground that his earlier solo piano albums had not already covered, it is nevertheless richly inventive within Jarrett's personal parameter of idioms. If price is not a barrier, the Jarrett devotee need not hesitate". A review by Thom Jurek of the 2021 facsimile edition refers to the album as "a pinnacle of creative invention in Jarrett's voluminous catalog".

Writing for Rolling Stone, Mikal Gilmore remarked: "Nowhere else in his collected works does music seem more effortless and splendid. From the opening phrase onward, it unfolds like an idyllic dream on the border of consciousness, and like the best of dreams – or narratives – you never want it to end. It is, to my mind, one of the few real self-contained epics in Seventies music."

Tyran Grillo, in a review at Between Sound and Space, commented: "The Sun Bear Concerts prove that not only is Jarrett an unparalleled improviser but a melodician of the highest order. These pieces are consistent in their striking differences, yet all seem couched in a palpable melancholy that is striated with joy. Despite the sheer volume of music that seems to reside in Jarrett's entire physiological being, one gets the sense after listening to these six-and-a-half hours of brilliance that they comprise but a single molecule of creation dissected and slowed to discernible speeds. At least we, at this moment in time, can witness these atomic paths, knowing full well that their beauty lies in an allegiance to silence. Not a single note ever feels out of place, because it has no place to begin with, except as the emblem of that which is gone before it arrives... If you ever buy only one recording of Keith Jarrett, look no further. Then again, why stop here?"

Jarrett biographer Ian Carr called Sun Bear Concerts "a monumental record of Jarrett's work at a crucial stage of his development," and wrote: "there are amazingly few dead or dull patches and all five concerts seem related like a massive suite. The improvisation also seems much more organic than on the earlier live solo albums... There are more new colours and new rhythms... and the music tends to evolve rather than to chop and change. There is a clear sense of ebbing and flowing, and the marvellous dynamics, ranging from triple forte to pianissimo, also enhance this."

Track listing 
All music by Keith Jarrett

 CD box-set

 LP-set

Total effective playing time: 6:34:00 (the album contains approximately 3:46 of applause).

Personnel 
 Keith Jarrett – piano

Production
 Manfred Eicher - producer
 Okihino Sugano - engineer (recording)
 Shinji Ohtsuka - engineer (recording)
 Klaus Knaup - photography
 Tadayuki Naitoh - photography
 Akira Aimi - photography
 Barbara Wojirsch - cover design and layout

References 

Keith Jarrett live albums
1978 live albums
ECM Records live albums
Albums produced by Manfred Eicher
Instrumental albums
Solo piano jazz albums